Yunokawa Onsen may refer to:

Yunokawa Onsen (Hokkaido), located in Hakodate, Hokkaidō Prefecture, Japan
Yunokawa Onsen (Shimane), located in Izumo, Shimane Prefecture, Japan